Toasting (rap in other parts of the Anglo Caribbean), or deejaying is the act of talking or chanting, usually in a monotone melody, over a rhythm or beat by a reggae deejay. It can either be improvised or pre-written.

Toasting developed in the United States and carried its form to the music of Jamaica, such as ska, reggae, dancehall, and dub. It also exists in grime music and is traditionally in hip hop. Toasting is also often used in soca and bouyon music. The African American oral tradition of toasting, a mix of talking and chanting, influenced the development of MCing in US hip hop music and in Jamaican toasting. The combination of singing and toasting is known as singjaying.

In the late 1950s in Jamaica, deejay toasting was [used] by Count Matchuki. He conceived the idea from listening to disc jockeys on American radio stations. He would do African American jive over the music while selecting and playing R&B music. Deejays like Count Machuki working for producers would play the latest hits on traveling sound systems at parties and add their toasts or vocals to the music. These toasts consisted of comedy, boastful commentaries, half-sung rhymes, rhythmic chants, squeals, screams and rhymed storytelling.

Osbourne Ruddock ( King Tubby) was a Jamaican sound recording engineer who created vocal-less rhythm backing tracks that were used by DJs doing toasting by creating one-off vinyl discs (also known as dub plates) of songs without the vocals and adding echo and sound effects.

Late 1960s toasting deejays included U-Roy and Dennis Alcapone, the latter known for mixing gangster talk with humor in his toasting. In the early 1970s, toasting deejays included I-Roy (his nickname is in homage to U-Roy) and Dillinger, the latter known for his humorous toasting style. In the early 1970s Big Youth became popular. In the late 1970s, Trinity followed.

The 1980s saw the first deejay toasting duo, Michigan & Smiley, and the development of toasting outside of Jamaica. In England, Pato Banton explored his Caribbean roots, humorous and political toasting while Ranking Roger of the Second Wave or Two-Tone ska revival band The Beat from the 1980s did Jamaican toasting over music that blended ska, pop, and some punk influences.

Jamaican deejay toasting also influenced various types of dance music, such as jungle music and UK garage. Dancehall artists that have achieved pop hits with toasting-influenced vocals include Shabba Ranks, Shaggy, Lady Saw, Sean Paul, Terror Fabulous and Damian Marley.

See also

 A cappella
 Beatbox
 Dancehall 
 Deejay 
 Doo-wop
 Onomatopoeia
 Scat singing
 Singjay
 Rapping
 Vocalese
 Voice instrumental music

References

Poetic rhythm
Reggae
Jamaican music
Dancehall